Soshanguve Giant Stadium, commonly referred to as Giant, is a multi-purpose stadium located in Soshanguve, a township of Pretoria, South Africa. It was utilized as a training field for teams participating in the 2010 FIFA World Cup after being rebuilt in 2009. Besides serving as a training venue for the World Cup, it was also used as a public viewing area for residents to watch matches.

Currently the stadium is the home for JDR Stars F.C. and Soshanguve Sunshine F.C., playing in the North West Province of Vodacom League. However, the stadium is situated a few kilometers within the border of the Gauteng province.

Giant Stadium was initially intended to become a surrounding fully built stadium by Y+K Architects as the planning and preliminary design of the stadium entailed the design of the full approximately 45,000 seater capacity stadium

However, construction was initially halted then ended, with only the western pavilion being  finally constructed, along with VVIP, VIP, player and full media facilities.

Gallery

References

External links
Y+K Architects: Giant Stadium Soshanguve
Photos of Stadiums in South Africa at cafe.daum.net/stade

Soccer venues in South Africa
Multi-purpose stadiums in South Africa
Sports venues in Pretoria